Elphick is a surname. Notable people with the surname include:

 Alice Elphick (1921–2008), Australian nun
 Gary Elphick (born 1985), British footballer
 Gladys Elphick (1904–1988), Australian Aboriginal activist
 Jonathan Elphick (born 1945), British writer
 Michael Elphick (1946–2002), British actor
 Roberto Valenzuela Elphick (1873–?), British-Chilean bishop
 Tommy Elphick (born 1987), British footballer

See also
 David Elfick (born 20 December 1944), Australian film writer and director
 Elphicke, surname